The Loire 30 a.k.a.Loire 300 was a French three-seat night reconnaissance monoplane designed and built by Loire Aviation of St. Nazaire.

Design and development
The Loire 30 was designed to meet a French Air Force requirement for a three-seat night reconnaissance aircraft. It was a cantilever high-wing monoplane and powered by three  Salmson 9Ab radial engines strut-mounted above the wing. The pilot had an enclosed cockpit with an open cockpit at the nose and amidships, both fitted with pivot-mounted 7.7 mm (0.303 in) machine-guns. Only one Loire 30 was produced in 1932, but it failed to gain an order and was relegated to experimental use.

Loire 301
After rejection in its original role, the sole Loire 30 / Loire 300 was modified with a very large windowless drum-shaped turret fitted in the nose and re-designated Loire 301. The purpose of the turret is uncertain; the favored theory of some references is an armored turret housing a large caliber gun; another theory is an airborne blind flying training simulator. To compensate the additional weight of the turret the central engine was moved backwards and inverted to drive a pusher propeller. This led to the unusual propulsion with two tractor and one pusher engines above the wings. Due to the turret resembling a type of copper laundry kettle commonly used at the time, the airplane was nicknamed la lessiveuse.

Specifications (Loire 30)

References

Notes

Bibliography

Loire 030
030
Trimotors
High-wing aircraft
Aircraft first flown in 1932